Mike Perez may refer to:

Mike Perez (American football) (born 1963), American football quarterback
Mike Pérez (baseball) (born 1964), Puerto Rican baseball pitcher
Mike Perez (boxer) (born 1985), Irish-based Cuban boxer

See also
Michael Pérez (born 1992), Puerto Rican baseball catcher
Michael Pérez Ortiz (born 1993), Mexican football (soccer) midfielder